Tomi Tuominen (born 8 November 1971) is a Finnish former rally co-driver. Past drivers include Toni Gardemeister and Juho Hänninen.

References

External links

Profile at ewrc-results.com

1971 births
Finnish rally co-drivers
Living people
World Rally Championship drivers
World Rally Championship co-drivers